The painted manakin (Machaeropterus eckelberryi) is a small South American species of passerine bird in the manakin family Pipridae. It was first described in 2017 from specimens collected in north west Peru.

Taxonomy
The painted manakin was described by the American ornithologist Daniel Lane and colleagues in 2017 and given the binomial name Machaeropterus eckelberryi. The specific epithet was chosen to commemorate the American bird artist Donald R. Eckelberry (1921-2000). The species is placed in the genus Machaeropterus that was introduced by the French naturalist Charles Lucien Bonaparte in 1854.

The painted manakin was described as a new species based solely on the differences in vocalization. It is morphologically identical to one of the subspecies of the striolated manakin (M. striolatus aureopectus). No genetic evidence has been published. The species is found on the eastern flanks of the Cordillera Escalera and Cordillera Azul near the valley of the Rio Mayo in the San Martín and Loreto Regions of Peru.

The painted manakin has been recognised as a valid species by the South American Classification Committee (SACC) of the American Ornithological Society and by Frank Gill and David Donsker who maintain a list of bird species on behalf of the International Ornithological Committee.

References

Birds of Peru
painted manakin
Painted manakin
painted manakin
painted manakin